Thomas Whyte may refer to:

 Thomas Whyte (merchant) (1492–1567),  English cloth merchant, Lord Mayor of London in 1553, and a civic benefactor and founder of St John's College, Oxford
 Thomas Whyte (academic) (fl. 1553–1573), English academic administrator at the University of Oxford
 Thomas Whyte (died 1580), English state official who informed on his co-conspirators in a plot to remove Queen Mary I of England in favour of her sister Elizabeth

See also 
Thomas White (disambiguation)
Thomas Wight (disambiguation)